Joseph Jorgensen (February 11, 1844 – January 21, 1888) was a U.S. Representative from Virginia.

Biography
Born in Philadelphia, Pennsylvania, Jorgensen graduated from the medical department of the University of Pennsylvania in 1865.
He served as a cadet surgeon in the United States Army in the latter part of the Civil War, from 1864 to 1865, rising to acting assistant surgeon, in mid-1865, and again serving from 1867 to 1870.
He served as a member of the Virginia house of delegates from Prince Edward County from 1872 to 1873.
He moved to Petersburg, Virginia.
He was appointed postmaster of Petersburg, Virginia, May 21, 1874 – June 8, 1877, when he resigned, having been elected to Congress.

Jorgensen was elected as a Republican to the Forty-fifth and to the two succeeding Congresses (March 4, 1877 – March 3, 1883).
He served as chairman of the Committee on Mileage (Forty-seventh Congress).
He served as delegate to the Republican National Convention in 1880.
He was appointed register of the land office at Walla Walla, Washington, by President Arthur February 27, 1883, and served until removed by President Cleveland in 1886.
He died on January 21, 1888, in Portland, Oreg..
He was interred in Mountain View Cemetery, Walla Walla, Washington.

Electoral history

1876; Jorgensen was elected to the U.S. House of Representatives with 51.91% of the vote, defeating Democrat William E. Hunton and Independent Republican M.R. De Mortie.
1878; Jorgensen was re-elected with 60.71% of the vote, defeating Democrat William E. Hinton, Jr.
1880; Jorgensen was re-elected with 70.1% of the vote, defeating Democrat Samuel F. Coleman and Independent William Ewan Cameron.

Sources

References

External links

 

1844 births
1888 deaths
Politicians from Walla Walla, Washington
United States Army Medical Corps officers
Republican Party members of the United States House of Representatives from Virginia
Perelman School of Medicine at the University of Pennsylvania alumni
19th-century American politicians
Burials in Washington (state)
Washington (state) Republicans